Decision Sciences Journal of Innovative Education is a peer-reviewed academic journal published by Wiley-Blackwell on behalf of the Decision Sciences Institute. The current editor-in-chief is Chetan Sankar (Auburn University). The  journal covers all areas related to decision science.

External links 
 

Business and management journals
Wiley-Blackwell academic journals
Triannual journals
English-language journals
Publications established in 2003
Decision theory